The Boston Bruins are a professional ice hockey team based in Boston. The Bruins compete in the National Hockey League (NHL) as a member of the Atlantic Division in the Eastern Conference. The team has been in existence since 1924, making them the third-oldest active team in the NHL, and the oldest to be based in the United States.

The Bruins are one of the Original Six NHL teams, along with the Detroit Red Wings, Chicago Blackhawks, Montreal Canadiens, New York Rangers, and Toronto Maple Leafs. They have won six Stanley Cup championships, tied for fourth-most of any team with the Blackhawks (trailing the Canadiens, Maple Leafs, and Red Wings, with 24, 13, and 11, respectively), and tied for second-most for an NHL team based in the United States.

The first facility to host the Bruins was the Boston Arena (now known as Matthews Arena), the world's oldest (built 1909–10) indoor ice hockey facility still in use for the sport at any level of competition. Following the Bruins' departure from the Boston Arena, the team played its home games at the Boston Garden for 67 seasons, beginning in 1928 and concluding in 1995, when they moved to the TD Garden.

History

Early years (1924–1942)
In 1924, the National Hockey League decided to expand to the United States. The previous year in 1923, Thomas Duggan received options on three NHL franchises for the United States, and sold one to Boston grocery magnate Charles Adams. The team was one of the NHL's first expansion teams, and the first NHL team to be based in the United States. Adams' first act was to hire Art Ross, a former star player and innovator, as general manager. Ross was the face of the franchise for the next thirty years, including four separate stints as coach.

Ross came up with "Bruins" for a team nickname, a name for brown bears used in classic folk tales. The team's nickname also went along with the team's original uniform colors of brown and yellow, which came from Adams' grocery chain, First National Stores.

On December 1, 1924, the Bruins the first ever NHL game played on United States soil, against the Montreal Maroons, at Boston Arena, with Smokey Harris scoring the first-ever Bruins goal, spurring the Bruins to a 2–1 win. This would be one of the few high points of the season, as the Bruins only managed a 6–24–0 record and finished in last place in its first season. The Bruins played three more seasons at the Arena, after which they became the main tenant of Boston Garden. 

The Bruins improved in their second season to a winning record, but the Bruins missed out on the third and final playoff berth by one point to the expansion Pittsburgh Pirates. In their third season, 1926–27, Ross took advantage of the collapse of the Western Hockey League to purchase several western stars, including the team's first great star, defenseman Eddie Shore. Boston qualified for the then-expanded playoffs by a comfortable margin. 

In their first-ever playoff run, the Bruins reached the Stanley Cup Final where they lost to the Ottawa Senators in the first Stanley Cup Finals to be between exclusively NHL teams. In 1929 the Bruins defeated the New York Rangers to win their first Stanley Cup. Standout players on the first championship team included Shore, Harry Oliver, Dit Clapper, Dutch Gainor and goaltender Tiny Thompson. The 1928–29 season was the first played at Boston Garden. The season after that, 1929–30, the Bruins posted the best-ever regular season winning percentage in the NHL (.875, a record which still stands) and shattered numerous scoring records, but lost to the Montreal Canadiens in the Stanley Cup Finals.

The 1930s Bruins teams included Shore, Thompson, Clapper, Babe Siebert and Cooney Weiland. The team led the league five times in the decade. In 1939, the team captured its second Stanley Cup. That year, Thompson was traded for rookie goaltender Frank Brimsek. Brimsek had an award-winning season, capturing the Vezina and Calder Trophies, becoming the first rookie named to the NHL first All-Star team, and earning the nickname "Mr. Zero." The team skating in front of Brimsek included Bill Cowley, Shore, Clapper and "Sudden Death" Mel Hill (who scored three overtime goals in one playoff series), together with the "Kraut Line" of center Milt Schmidt, right winger Bobby Bauer and left winger Woody Dumart.

In 1940 Shore was traded to the struggling New York Americans for his final NHL season. In 1941 the Bruins won their third Stanley Cup after losing only eight games and finishing first in the regular season. It was their last Stanley Cup for 29 years. World War II affected the Bruins more than most teams; Brimsek and the "Krauts" all enlisted after the 1940–41 Cup win, and lost the most productive years of their careers at war. Cowley, assisted by veteran player Clapper and Busher Jackson, was the team's remaining star.

Original Six era (1942–1967)
The NHL had by 1942 been reduced to the six teams that would be called the "Original Six", and in 1944, Bruin Herb Cain set the then-NHL record for points in a season with 82. But the Bruins did not make the playoffs that season.

The stars returned for the 1945–46 season, and Clapper led the team back to the Stanley Cup Finals as player-coach. He retired as a player after the next season, becoming the first player to play twenty NHL seasons. Brimsek proved to be not as good as he was before the war, and after 1946 the Bruins lost in the first playoff round three straight years. After Brimsek was traded to the Blackhawks, the only remaining quality young player was forward Johnny Peirson.

During the 1948–49 season, the original form of the "spoked-B" logo, with a small number "24" to the left of the capital B signifying the calendar year in the 20th century in which the Bruins team first played, and a similarly small "49" to the right of the "B", appeared on their home uniforms. The following season, the logo was modified into the basic "spoked-B" form that was to be used thereafter.

The 1950s began with Charles Adams' son Weston facing financial trouble. He was forced to accept a buyout offer from Walter A. Brown, the owner of the Boston Celtics and the Garden, in 1951. Although there were some instances of success (such as making the Stanley Cup Finals in 1953, 1957, and 1958, only to lose to the Montreal Canadiens each time), the Bruins mustered only four winning seasons between 1947 and 1967. They missed the playoffs eight straight years between 1960 and 1967.

On January 18, 1958, the first black person ever to play in the NHL stepped onto the ice for the Bruins, Willie O'Ree. He played in 45 games for the Bruins over the 1957–58 and 1960–61 seasons. The "Uke Line"—named for the Ukrainian heritage of Johnny Bucyk, Vic Stasiuk, and Bronco Horvath – came to Boston in 1957 and enjoyed four productive offensive seasons, heralding, along with scoring stalwarts Don McKenney and Fleming MacKell, the successful era of the late 1950s. There followed a long and difficult reconstruction period in the early to mid-1960s.

Expansion and the Big Bad Bruins (1967–1979)
Weston Adams repurchased the Bruins in 1964 after Brown's death. Adams signed future superstar defenseman Bobby Orr, who entered the league in 1966. Orr was that season's winner of the Calder Memorial Trophy for Rookie of the Year and named to the second NHL All-Star Team. Despite Orr's stellar rookie season, the Bruins would miss the playoffs. 

The next season, Boston made the playoffs for the first of 29 straight seasons, an all-time record. The Bruins then obtained forwards Phil Esposito, Ken Hodge and Fred Stanfield from Chicago in a deal celebrated as one of the most one-sided in hockey history. Hodge and Stanfield became key elements of the Bruins' success, and Esposito, who centered a line with Hodge and Wayne Cashman, became the league's top goal scorer and the first NHL player to break the 100-point mark, setting many goal- and point-scoring records. With other stars like forwards Bucyk, John McKenzie, Derek Sanderson, and Hodge, defenders like Dallas Smith and goaltender Gerry Cheevers, the "Big Bad Bruins" became one of the league's top teams from the late 1960s into the 1980s.

In 1970, a 29-year Stanley Cup drought came to an end in Boston, as the Bruins defeated the St. Louis Blues in four games in the Final. Orr scored the game-winning goal in overtime to clinch the Stanley Cup. The same season was Orr's most awarded—the third of eight consecutive years he won the James Norris Memorial Trophy as the top defenseman in the NHL—and he won the Art Ross Trophy, the Conn Smythe Trophy and the Hart Memorial Trophy, the only player to ever win four major awards in the same season.

While Sinden temporarily retired from hockey before 1970–71 season to enter business (he was replaced by ex-Bruin and Canadien defenseman Tom Johnson), the Bruins set dozens of offensive scoring records: they had seven of the league's top ten scorers—a feat not achieved before or since—set the record for wins in a season, and in a league that had never seen a 100-point scorer before 1969, the Bruins had four that year. All four (Orr, Esposito, Bucyk and Hodge) were named First Team All-Stars. Boston were favored to repeat as Cup champions but lost to the Canadiens (and rookie goaltender Ken Dryden) in seven games.

While the Bruins were not quite as dominant the next season, Esposito and Orr were once again one-two in the scoring standings and Boston regained the Stanley Cup by defeating the New York Rangers in six games in the Finals. 

The 1972–73 season saw upheaval for the Bruins. Former head coach Sinden became the general manager. Bruins players Gerry Cheevers, Derek Sanderson, Johnny McKenzie and Ted Green left to join the World Hockey Association. Coach Tom Johnson was fired 52 games into the season, replaced by Bep Guidolin. The Adams family, which had owned the team since its founding in the 1920s, sold it to Storer Broadcasting. The Bruins' season came to a premature end in a first-round loss to the Rangers in the 1973 playoffs. In 1974, the Bruins regained their first-place standing in the regular season, with three 100-point scorers on the team (Esposito, Orr, and Hodge). However, they lost the 1974 Final in an upset to the Philadelphia Flyers.

Don Cherry stepped behind the bench as the new coach in 1974–75. The Bruins stocked themselves with enforcers and grinders, and remained competitive under Cherry's reign, the so-called "Lunch Pail A.C"., behind players such as Gregg Sheppard, Terry O'Reilly, Stan Jonathan and Peter McNab. This would also turn out to be Orr's final full season in the league, before his knee injuries worsened, as well as the last time Orr and Esposito would finish 1–2 in regular season scoring. The Bruins placed second in the Adams Division, and lost to the Chicago Black Hawks in the first round of the 1975 playoffs, losing a best-of-three series, two games to one.

Continuing with Sinden's rebuilding of the team, the Bruins traded Esposito and Carol Vadnais for Brad Park, Jean Ratelle and Joe Zanussi to the Rangers.  The Bruins made the semi-finals again, losing to the Flyers, before losing Orr as a free agent to Chicago in the off-season.

Cheevers returned 1977, and the Bruins got past the Flyers in the semi-finals, but were swept by the Canadiens in the Stanley Cup Finals. The story repeated itself in 1978—with a balanced attack that saw Boston have eleven players with 20+ goal seasons, still the NHL record—as the Bruins made the Final once more, but lost in six games to Montreal. After that series, John Bucyk retired, holding virtually every Bruins' career longevity and scoring mark to that time.

The 1979 semi-final series against the Habs proved to be Cherry's undoing. In the deciding seventh game, the Bruins, up by a goal, were called for having too many men on the ice in the late stages of the third period. Montreal tied the game on the ensuing power play and won in overtime. Cherry was dismissed as head coach thereafter.

Ray Bourque era (1979–2000)
The 1979 season saw a head coach Fred Creighton -- and a trade of goaltender Ron Grahame to the Los Angeles Kings for a first-round pick which was used to select Ray Bourque, one of the greatest defensemen of all-time and the face of the Bruins for over two decades. The Bruins made the playoffs every year through the 1980s behind stars such as Park, Bourque and Rick Middleton—and had the league's best record in 1983 behind a Vezina Trophy–winning season from ex-Flyer goaltender Pete Peeters, with 110 points—but fell short of making the Finals.

Bourque, Cam Neely and Keith Crowder led the Bruins to another Stanley Cup Finals appearance in 1988 against the Edmonton Oilers. The Bruins lost in a four-game sweep. Boston returned to the Stanley Cup Finals in 1990 (with Neely, Bourque, Craig Janney, Bobby Carpenter, and rookie Don Sweeney, and former Oiler goalie Andy Moog and Reggie Lemelin splitting goaltending duties), but again lost to the Oilers, this time in five games.

In the 1987–88 NHL season, the Bruins defeated their Original Six nemesis Montreal Canadiens in the playoffs. In 1991 and 1992, the Bruins suffered two consecutive Conference Final losses to the eventual Cup champion, the Pittsburgh Penguins. Starting from the 1992–93 NHL season onwards, the Bruins had not gotten past the second round of the playoffs until winning the Stanley Cup after the 2011 season.

The 1992–93 season ended disappointingly. Despite finishing with the second-best regular season record after Pittsburgh, Boston was swept in the first round by the Buffalo Sabres. Bourque made the NHL All-Star First Team.

The 1995 season was the Bruins' last at the Boston Garden. The final official match played in the Garden was a 3–0 loss to the New Jersey Devils in the 1995 playoffs; the Bruins went on to play the final game at the old arena on September 28, 1995, in an exhibition matchup against the Canadiens. They subsequently moved into the FleetCenter, now known as the TD Garden. In the 1996 playoffs, the Bruins lost their first-round series to the Florida Panthers in five games.

In 1997, Boston missed the playoffs for the first time in 30 years (and for the first time in the expansion era), having set the North American major professional record for most consecutive seasons in the playoffs. The Bruins lost in the first round of the 1998 playoffs to the Washington Capitals in six games. In 1999, the Bruins defeated the Carolina Hurricanes in six games during the first round of the playoffs. Nevertheless, they would lose to the Sabres in six games in the second round of the playoffs.

The new millennium
In the 1999–2000 season, the Bruins finished in last place in the Northeast Division and failed to qualify for the playoffs. During a game between the Bruins and the Vancouver Canucks on February 21, 2000, Marty McSorley was ejected for using his stick to hit Canucks forward Donald Brashear in the head, and subsequently suspended for what resulted in the rest of his career.

After a mediocre start, the Bruins fired coach Pat Burns in favor of Mike Keenan. Despite a 15-point improvement, the Bruins missed the playoffs in 2000–01, and Keenan was let go. Center Jason Allison led the Bruins in scoring. The following season, 2001–02, the Bruins won their first Northeast Division title since 1993 with a core built around Joe Thornton, Sergei Samsonov, Brian Rolston, Bill Guerin, Mike Knuble and Glen Murray. They lost in six games to the Montreal Canadiens in the first round of the playoffs.

The 2002–03 season found the Bruins finishing seventh in the East, but lost to the eventual Stanley Cup champion New Jersey Devils in five games. In 2003–04, the Bruins won another division title and appeared to get past the first round for the first time in five years with a 3–1 series lead on the rival Canadiens. However, the Canadiens rallied back to win three-straight games, upsetting the Bruins.

The 2004–05 NHL season was wiped out by a lockout, and Bruins management eschewed younger free agents in favor of older veterans. The Bruins fired general manager Mike O'Connell in March and the Bruins missed the playoffs for the first time in five years.

Peter Chiarelli was hired as the new general manager of the team. Head coach Mike Sullivan was fired and Dave Lewis, former coach of the Detroit Red Wings, was hired to replace him. The Bruins signed star defenseman Zdeno Chara, and center Marc Savard. The 2006–07 season ended in the team finishing in last place in the division. 

After the disappointing 2007 season, Lewis was fired as coach, replaced by Claude Julien. 

The 2008 campaign saw the Bruins finish 41–29–12 and making the playoffs. Although Bruins center Patrice Bergeron was injured with a concussion most of the season, youngsters Milan Lucic, David Krejci and Vladimir Sobotka showed promise in the playoffs.

After a slow start to the 2008–09 season, the Bruins went on to have the best record in the Eastern Conference and qualified for the playoffs for the fifth time in nine years, facing the Canadiens in the playoffs for the fourth time during that span, defeating them in four games before losing in seven games to the Carolina Hurricanes in the conference semi-finals.

On January 1, 2010, the Bruins won the 2010 NHL Winter Classic over the Philadelphia Flyers in a 2–1 overtime decision at Fenway Park, thus becoming the first home team to win an outdoor classic game. They finished in sixth place in the Eastern Conference, and a 2010 NHL playoff opening round appearance against the Buffalo Sabres, which they won 4–2. Boston became only the third team in NHL history to lose a playoff series after leading 3–0 when they lost in Game 7 to the Philadelphia Flyers.

In the 2011 Stanley Cup playoffs, the Bruins eliminated the Montreal Canadiens in seven games. On May 6, the Bruins swept the Philadelphia Flyers in four games to advance to the Eastern Conference Finals for the first time since 1992. Boston then defeated the Tampa Bay Lightning in seven games and advanced to the Stanley Cup Finals for the first time since 1990 to face the Vancouver Canucks, defeating them in seven games for the team's first Stanley Cup since 1972. The 2010–11 Bruins were the first team in NHL history to win a Game 7 three times in the same playoff run.

Following their Stanley Cup win, the Bruins lost Mark Recchi to retirement and Michael Ryder and Tomas Kaberle to free agency. The Bruins went on to finish second in the Eastern Conference with 102 points, winning the Northeast Division title, but losing to the Washington Capitals in the first round of the 2012 Stanley Cup playoffs in seven games.

During the off-season preceding the lockout, Tim Thomas made his decision to sit out the 2012–13 season; his rights were traded to the New York Islanders. The Bruins battled the Montreal Canadiens for leadership in the Northeast Division all season, before a loss to the Ottawa Senators in a make-up game following the Boston Marathon bombing on April 28 gave the Canadiens the division title. 

In the opening round of the 2013 playoffs, the Bruins took on the Toronto Maple Leafs, defeating them in seven games.  They went on to beat the New York Rangers in five games and the Pittsburgh Penguins in a four-game sweep to advance to the Stanley Cup Finals and the Chicago Blackhawks, falling in six games, with three going into overtime.

In the 2013–14 season, the Bruins won the Presidents' Trophy after finishing first in the newly formed Atlantic Division with a record of 54–19–9 for 117 points. Their regular season success, however, would not translate into another Eastern Conference Finals appearance. Despite winning their first-round series against the Detroit Red Wings, the team fell to the Canadiens in seven games in the Eastern Conference Semi-finals during the 2014 playoffs.

In the 2014–15 season, the Bruins finished with a record of 41–27–14 for 96 points, missing out on the playoffs by just two points after the Pittsburgh Penguins and the Ottawa Senators clinched the final two playoff spots in the East. The Bruins therefore became only the third team to miss the playoffs after winning the Presidents' Trophy in the previous season. The 96 points they earned that season broke the record for the most points earned by a team that did not make the playoffs.

Don Sweeney era (2015–present)
On April 15, 2015, Peter Chiarelli was fired by the Boston Bruins. On May 20, the Bruins named former player Don Sweeney as the team's new general manager for the 2015–16 season. One recent all-time franchise achievement the Bruins attained in the 2015–16 season is shared by only their greatest rival, the Canadiens – a total of 3,000 wins in the team's existence, achieved by the Bruins on January 8, 2016, in a 4–1 road victory against the New Jersey Devils. The team was seen as a playoff contender throughout the regular season. However, a sub-.500 record on home ice and frequent road losses in the final two months of the regular season resulted in a three-way battle for the final playoff spot in the East. The Bruins had a chance to clinch the final playoff berth with a win over the Ottawa Senators on the second-to-last day of the season, but they lost the game. That loss, combined with a Flyers' win over the Penguins, knocked the Bruins out of playoff contention in favor of the Flyers. For the first time since the two seasons following the 2004–05 lockout, the Bruins did not qualify for the playoffs in two consecutive seasons.

 
During the last two months of the 2016–17 regular season, the Bruins fired head coach Claude Julien and promoted Bruce Cassidy to interim coach. Cassidy's very slight changes in coaching to emphasize the players' speed and hockey skills, as opposed to Julien's, resulted in the Bruins achieving an 18–8–1 record through their remaining regular season games, finishing third in the Atlantic Division and qualifying for the playoffs for the first time since the 2013–14 season. In the first round of the playoffs, the Bruins lost to the Ottawa Senators in six games.

Cassidy returned as head coach for the 2017–18 season, leading the Bruins to the playoffs for the second straight year. They had a record of 50–20–12, including an 18-game point streak, which lasted from December 14, 2017, to January 25, 2018. They finished one point behind the Tampa Bay Lightning for the top spot in the Atlantic Division. They defeated the Toronto Maple Leafs in the first round, 4–3, but ultimately lost to the Lightning in round two, 4–1. The season saw young players perform well, including Jake DeBrusk, Danton Heinen, Ryan Donato, and Charlie McAvoy. The Bruins also acquired veterans Rick Nash, Nick Holden, Brian Gionta, and Tommy Wingels through trades or through free-agent signings.

During the 2018–19 season the Bruins finished the regular season in second place in the division with a 49–24–9 overall record. During the trade deadline the team acquired Charlie Coyle and Marcus Johansson. In the first round of the 2019 Stanley Cup playoffs, as in the previous season, they faced the Maple Leafs, defeating them in seven games. In a six-game series, the Bruins defeated the Columbus Blue Jackets in the second round, and advanced to the Eastern Conference Finals for the first time since 2013. The Bruins would later win the Eastern Conference Finals by sweeping out the Carolina Hurricanes in four games, thus winning the Prince of Wales Trophy and advancing to the 2019 Stanley Cup Finals for the third time in 10 years. They faced the St. Louis Blues in a rematch of the 1970 Stanley Cup Finals. This time however, the Blues would emerge victorious, winning in seven games.

During the 2019–20 season, the Bruins consistently had the best record in the Atlantic Division and were near the top of the league. During the trade deadline, they acquired Ondrej Kase and Nick Ritchie, both from the Anaheim Ducks, in two separate trades. On March 12, 2020, the NHL season was paused due to the COVID-19 pandemic. At the time of the pause, the Bruins were first overall in the league, with 100 points. On May 26, Commissioner Gary Bettman announced that the 2019–20 regular season was completed, and that the league would resume with the playoffs. The Bruins were awarded the Presidents' Trophy for the second time in a decade, while David Pastrnak's 48 goals made him the first Bruin to win the Maurice "Rocket" Richard Trophy, which he shared with Alexander Ovechkin. During the 2020 Stanley Cup playoffs, the Bruins won the first round against the Carolina Hurricanes in five games, but lost to the Tampa Bay Lightning in the second round, also in five games. In the 2020–21 season, the Bruins made the 2021 playoffs, where they defeated the Washington Capitals in five games, but lost to the New York Islanders in six games. In the next season, the Bruins clinched the 2022 playoffs as a wild card, but were defeated by the Hurricanes in seven games. Following the season, head coach Cassidy was fired. They then hired Jim Montgomery, previously the head coach of the Dallas Stars, as their next head coach on July 3, 2022.

During the 2022-2023 season, the Bruins set an all-time NHL record as the fastest team to achieve 50 wins, hitting the mark in 64 games compared to a previous record of 66 games held jointly by the 1995-1996 Detroit Red Wings and the 2018-2019 Tampa Bay Lightning. In that same game, the Bruins became the third-fastest team in history to clinch a playoff spot during the era of 82-game seasons, trailing only the 1995-1996 Detroit Red Wings (59 games) and the 1998-1999 Dallas Stars (63 games).

Team information

Logo and uniforms
Since 1948, the Bruins' logo is an eight-spoked, black and gold wheel with the letter "B" in the center, a nod to Boston's nickname of "The Hub". The logo has been tweaked numerous times over the course of its history, reaching its current form in 2007. The block "B" logo itself preceded the "Spoked B" and is currently the logo used in their third jersey.

The Bruins have also used an alternate logo featuring a walking bear surrounded by the full team name. The logo was first used from 1924 to 1932, and a modernized version was adopted as the team's secondary logo in 2007.

The Bruins' colors were originally brown and gold. They wore brown uniforms in their maiden season, but switched to a white uniform with alternating brown and gold stripes the next season. The uniforms were paired with beige pants and either gold or white socks. After the 1932 season the walking bear logo was replaced with a simple "B" logo.

Starting with the 1935–36 season, the Bruins replaced brown with black, while also sporting gold socks full-time. The "B" logo moved to the sleeves while the uniform number occupied the front. Black pants also replaced the beige pants.

For a majority of the 1940s, the Bruins sported gold numbers on the white uniform. From 1940 to 1944 they also wore a gold uniform with a script "Bruins" wordmark in front. To commemorate their 25th anniversary, the Bruins released a new white uniform featuring the first iteration of the "Spoked B" logo. They also debuted a black uniform with the "B" logo in front.

Beginning in 1949, the "B" on the "Spoked B" logo was changed to block lettering. They also brought back the black numbers. With a few cosmetic changes in the stripes and yoke along with the addition of the primitive bear head logo in 1977, the Bruins kept this overall design until 1995.

In 1955, the Bruins brought the "Spoked B" logo over to the black uniform; they also released a gold jersey with the "Spoked B" in front. During this period, the gold jersey was used as the primary dark uniform while relegating the black uniform (updated with white numbers) into alternate status for several seasons. Also, for a few games between 1958 and 1965, the Bruins wore gold pants.

In 1967, the Bruins retired the gold uniforms and reinstated the black uniforms with gold numbers. As with the white uniforms, they endured several cosmetic changes until 1995. The gold socks, which had numerous striping modifications since 1934, was briefly retired in favor of wearing white socks full-time. It was brought back for the 1969–70 season and would be paired with the regular black uniforms for the next 47 seasons.

Starting with the 1995–96 season, the Bruins released a new uniform set, featuring the updated "Spoked B" logo. The primary uniforms featured a thick contrasting stripe that extended from sleeve to sleeve. In addition, a gold third jersey was released, featuring the infamous "Pooh Bear" logo (an homage to Winnie the Pooh). The gold thirds were used until 2006, after which the Bruins wore throwback black uniforms based on the 1970s design.

Moving to the Reebok Edge template in 2007, the Bruins unveiled new uniforms with the current "Spoked B" logo. The overall design borrowed a few elements from the 1970s uniforms, and also unveiled a new rendition of the original walking bear logo on the shoulders. The following season, they released new black third jerseys with the aforementioned bear logo in front and the "Spoked B" logo on the shoulders.

For the 2010 Winter Classic, the Bruins wore a brown and gold variation of the 1948–49 design. Then for the 2016 Winter Classic, the Bruins wore a black and gold variation of the original brown uniforms, a design they carried over the following season as an alternate.

The Bruins kept much of the same design upon moving to Adidas' AdiZero template in 2017. However, the black uniforms were now paired with black socks, a feature previously reserved on the alternate black uniforms.

For the 2019 Winter Classic, the Bruins wore white uniforms with brown and gold stripes and the "B" logo in front, paying homage to the mid-1930s uniforms. The simple "B" logo also adorned their new black alternate uniform, which was unveiled in the 2019–20 season and paid homage to the team's 1950s uniforms.

Prior to the 2020–21 season, Adidas released its "Reverse Retro" series of alternate uniforms, which were alternate color renditions of throwback uniform designs. The Bruins' version was taken from the team's 1977 to 1995 design, but with a gold base and black accents. A second "Reverse Retro" uniform was released in the 2022–23 season, this time featuring a white version of the 1995–2006 "Pooh Bear" alternates.

Boston's 2023 Winter Classic uniform mixed various styles from the team's uniform history. The black-based uniform featured gold stripes and vintage white letters. The "BOSTON" wordmark was inspired by the 1949 "Spoked B" logo, and the original bear head logo from 1977 to 1995 was positioned below.

Ownership
The team founder Charles Adams owned the team until 1936, at which point he transferred his stock to son Weston Adams, general manager and minority owner Art Ross and minority owner Ralph Burkard. Weston Adams remained majority owner until 1951, when the Boston Garden-Arena Corporation purchased controlling interest in the team. Under the Garden-Arena Corporation's management, Boston Celtics founder Walter A. Brown ran the team from 1951 until his death in 1964. After Brown's death, Weston Adams returned to the role of team president. In 1969, he was succeeded by his son, Weston Adams, Jr.

On December 7, 1973, Storer Broadcasting, owner of WSBK-TV, and the Garden-Arena Corporation agreed to a merger which resulted in Storer acquiring a 100% interest in the Bruins. Adams remained as team president. In August 1975, Storer Broadcasting then sold the team to an ownership group headed by Jeremy Jacobs. Jacobs had to promise to keep Bobby Orr as a condition of the purchase. The Bruins and Orr reached a verbal agreement with Jacobs during the summer of 1975, including a controversial agreement for Orr to take an 18.5% share of the Bruins after his playing days were over. The agreement was to be checked out as to whether it would be legal for tax reasons and whether or not the league would approve it. However, Orr's agent, the later-notorious Alan Eagleson, rejected the deal.

Jacobs represents the club on the NHL's board of governors, and serves on its executive committee, and he has chaired the finance committee. At the NHL board of governors meeting in June 2007, Jacobs was elected chairman of the board, replacing the Calgary Flames' Harley Hotchkiss, who stepped down after 12 years in the position. Jacobs has frequently been listed by the Sports Business Journal as one of the most influential people in sports in its annual poll and by The Hockey News. His company owns TD Garden and he is partners with John Henry, owner of Major League Baseball's Boston Red Sox, in the New England Sports Network (NESN).

After taking over as owner in 1975, the Bruins have been competitive (making the playoffs for 29-straight seasons from 1967–68 to 1995–96, 20 of which were with Jacobs as owner) but have won the Stanley Cup only once, in 2011 and only in his 36th year as owner. Under previous ownerships, the Bruins had won the Stanley Cup five times. Under Jacobs, the Bruins have reached the Stanley Cup Finals seven times (twice against the Bruins' arch-rival Montreal Canadiens in 1977 and 1978, twice against the Edmonton Oilers in 1988 and 1990, finally winning in 2011 against the Vancouver Canucks, and losing in 2013 and 2019 to the Chicago Blackhawks and St. Louis Blues). Jacobs' management of the team in the past earned him spots on ESPN.com's "Page 2" polls of "The Worst Owners in Sports," and number 7 on their 2005 "Greediest Owners in sports" list. Sports Illustrated has suggested longtime star defenseman Ray Bourque, who "often drawn the ire of the NHLPA for his willingness to re-sign with Boston with minimal negotiations over the years" instead of setting the "watermark for defenseman salaries", requested and received a trade in 2000 since the team's "hardline and spendthrift ways" meant he would have to make the move to get his elusive Stanley Cup (Bourque holds the record for most games played before winning the Cup). Prior to the NHL Collective Bargaining Agreement signed in 2005, fans felt team management was not willing to spend to win the Stanley Cup.

Since 2005, Jacobs' public image has improved as he invested in the team and rebuilding the front office to make the team more competitive. The Bruins were the second highest-ranked team in the NHL in the 2008–09 season and were the top-seeded team in the East. With a complete change in management, including now-former general manager Peter Chiarelli – who lost his position with the Bruins on April 15, 2015, with the May 20 hiring of Don Sweeney – long-time assistant general manager with the team. Sweeney and team president Cam Neely had continued working with the longest-term Bruins head coach ever, Claude Julien until his firing on February 7, 2017, with Bruce Cassidy being hired as interim head coach with Julien's firing – Cassidy would become the permanent head coach of the Bruins as of April 26, 2017. Neely has continued as team president since the Bruins' most recent Stanley Cup victory in 2011.
The current administrators in the Bruins front office are:

 Jeremy Jacobs: Owner
 Charlie Jacobs: Principal
 Don Sweeney: General Manager
 Cam Neely: President
 Harry Sinden: Senior Advisor to the Owner

Training facilities
The Bruins previously trained and practiced at the Bright-Landry Hockey Center in Allston, Massachusetts (built in 1956), then moved to the Ristuccia Ice Arena in Wilmington, Massachusetts, itself completed in 1986, before the September 2016 completion of Warrior Ice Arena in the Brighton neighborhood of Boston, where they are currently training.

Bruins' mascots

Blades the Bruin is an anthropomorphic bear serves as the Bruins' team mascot. In January and February, Blades travels around the greater Boston area to raise money for the Bruins Foundation. For a sizable amount of the team's more recent TV and online ads, a different anthropomorphic ursine character simply known as "The Bear" appears in official Bruins video advertising.

Team songs
When Boston television station WSBK-TV began broadcasting Bruins games in 1967, The Ventures' instrumental rock version of the Nutcracker's overture, known as "Nutty", was selected as the opening piece of music for Bruins telecasts. The song "Nutty" has been identified with the Bruins ever since.

On ice, "Paree", a 1920s hit tune written by Leo Robin and Jose Padilla, has been played as an organ instrumental for decades, typically as the players entered the arena just before the start of each period and, for many years, after each Bruins' goal. It was introduced by John Kiley, the organist for the Bruins from the 1950s through the 1980s. In 1998, the John Kiley rendition of "Paree" was dropped as a goal song; "Kernkraft 400 (Sport Chant Stadium Remix)" by Zombie Nation is the current one.

Season-by-season record
This is a partial list of the last five seasons completed by the Bruins. For the full season-by-season history, see List of Boston Bruins seasons

Note: GP = Games played, W = Wins, L = Losses, T = Ties, OTL = Overtime losses, Pts = Points, GF = Goals for, GA = Goals against

Players and personnel

Current roster

Team captains

 Sprague Cleghorn, 1925–1928
 Lionel Hitchman, 1928–31
 George Owen, 1931–1932
 Dit Clapper, 1932–1938, 1939–1946
 Cooney Weiland, 1938–1939
 John Crawford, 1946–1950
 Milt Schmidt, 1950–1954
 Ed Sandford, 1954–1955
 Fernie Flaman, 1955–1961
 Don McKenney, 1961–1963
 Leo Boivin, 1963–1966
 Johnny Bucyk, 1966–1967; 1973–1977
 Wayne Cashman, 1977–1983
 Terry O'Reilly, 1983–1985
 Ray Bourque and Rick Middleton, 1985–1988 (co-captains)
 Ray Bourque, 1988–2000
 Jason Allison, 2000–2001
 Joe Thornton, 2002–2005
 Zdeno Chara, 2006–2020
 Patrice Bergeron, 2021–present

There is evidence from contemporary newspaper accounts and photographs that Bruins manager Art Ross appointed captains on an annual basis in the 1930s and 1940s, and generally for a single season only.  These include Marty Barry in 1934–35, Nels Stewart in 1935–36, Eddie Shore in 1936–37, Red Beattie in 1937–38, Bill Cowley in 1945–46 and Bobby Bauer in 1947–48.  None of these captaincies are currently acknowledged by the Bruins' organization, which has declined comment on the question.

Head coaches

On June 30, 2022, the Bruins named Montgomery head coach, replacing Bruce Cassidy.

General managers

Following the team's failure to make the 2015 playoffs, Peter Chiarelli was fired as general manager on April 15, 2015, with Don Sweeney hired as Chiarelli's replacement on May 20, 2015.

Presidents

 Charles F. Adams, November 1, 1924 – 1936
 Weston W. Adams, Sr., 1936–1951
 Walter A. Brown, 1951 – September 1964
 Weston W. Adams, Sr., September 1964 – March 30, 1969
 Weston W. Adams, Jr., March 31, 1969 – September 30, 1975
 Paul A. Mooney, October 1, 1975 – March 24, 1987
 William D. Hassett, Jr., March 24, 1987 – December 1, 1988
 Harry Sinden, December 1, 1988 – August 9, 2006
 Cam Neely, June 16, 2010 – present

First-round draft picks

 1963: Orest Romashyna (3rd overall)
 1964: Alex Campbell (2nd overall)
 1965: Joe Bailey (4th overall)
 1966: Barry Gibbs (1st overall)
 1967: Meehan Bonnar (10th overall)
 1968: Danny Schock (12th overall)
 1969: Don Tannahill (3rd overall), Frank Spring (4th overall), and Ivan Boldirev (11th overall)
 1970: Reggie Leach (3rd overall), Rick MacLeish (4th overall), Ron Plumb (9th overall), and Bob Stewart (13th overall)
 1971: Ron Jones (6th overall) and Terry O'Reilly (14th overall)
 1972: Mike Bloom (16th overall)
 1973: Andre Savard (6th overall)
 1974: Don Larway (18th overall)
 1975: Doug Halward (14th overall)
 1976: Clayton Pachal (16th overall)
 1977: Dwight Foster (16th overall)
 1978: Al Secord (16th overall)
 1979: Ray Bourque (8th overall) and Brad McCrimmon (15th overall)
 1980: Barry Pederson (18th overall)
 1981: Normand Leveille (14th overall)
 1982: Gord Kluzak (1st overall)
 1983: Nevin Markwart (21st overall)
 1984: Dave Pasin (19th overall)
 1985: None
 1986: Craig Janney (13th overall)
 1987: Glen Wesley (3rd overall) and Stephane Quintal (14th overall)
 1988: Robert Cimetta (18th overall)
 1989: Shayne Stevenson (17th overall)
 1990: Bryan Smolinski (21st overall)
 1991: Glen Murray (18th overall)
 1992: Dmitri Kvartalnov (16th overall)
 1993: Kevyn Adams (25th overall)
 1994: Evgeni Ryabchikov (21st overall)
 1995: Kyle McLaren (9th overall) and Sean Brown (21st overall)
 1996: Johnathan Aitken (8th overall)
 1997: Joe Thornton (1st overall) and Sergei Samsonov (8th overall)
 1998: None
 1999: Nick Boynton (21st overall)
 2000: Lars Jonsson (7th overall) and Martin Samuelsson (27th overall)
 2001: Shaone Morrisonn (19th overall)
 2002: Hannu Toivonen (29th overall)
 2003: Mark Stuart (21st overall)
 2004: None
 2005: Matt Lashoff (22nd overall)
 2006: Phil Kessel (5th overall)
 2007: Zach Hamill (8th overall)
 2008: Joe Colborne (16th overall)
 2009: Jordan Caron (25th overall)
 2010: Tyler Seguin (2nd overall)
 2011: Dougie Hamilton (9th overall)
 2012: Malcolm Subban (24th overall)
 2013: None
 2014: David Pastrnak (25th overall)
 2015: Jakub Zboril (13th overall), Jake DeBrusk (14th overall) and Zachary Senyshyn (15th overall)
 2016: Charlie McAvoy (14th overall), Trent Frederic (29th overall)
 2017: Urho Vaakanainen (18th overall)
 2018: None
 2019: John Beecher (30th overall)
 2020: None
 2021: Fabian Lysell (21st overall)
 2022: None

Team and league honors

Retired numbers

Notes:
1 Hitchman was the first player to have his number retired by the Bruins, and the second in both the NHL, and in all of North American professional sports.
 The NHL retired Wayne Gretzky's number 99 for all of its member teams at the 2000 NHL All-Star Game.
 The Bruins are the only Original Six team that have not retired the uniform number 1.

Hall of Famers
The Boston Bruins presently acknowledge an affiliation with a number of inductees to the Hockey Hall of Fame. Inductees affiliated with the Bruins include 52 former players and seven builders of the sport. The six individuals recognized as builders by the Hall of Fame includes former Bruins executives, general managers, head coaches, and owners. In addition to players and builders, two broadcasters for the Bruins were also awarded the Foster Hewitt Memorial Award from the Hockey Hall of Fame. In 1984, Fred Cusick, a play-by-play announcer, was awarded the Hall of Fame's inaugural Foster Hewitt Memorial Award. In 1987, Bob Wilson became the second Bruins' broadcaster to be awarded the Foster Hewitt Memorial Award.

Franchise leaders

All-time regular season scoring leaders 
These are the top-ten regular season point-scorers in franchise history. Figures are updated after each completed NHL regular season.
  – current Bruins player
Note: Pos = Position; GP = Games played; G = Goals; A = Assists; Pts = Points; P/G = Points per game

All-time playoff scoring leaders 
These are the top-ten playoff point-scorers in franchise history. Figures are updated after each completed NHL regular season.
  – current Bruins player
Note: Pos = Position; GP = Games played; G = Goals; A = Assists; Pts = Points; P/G = Points per game

All-time leading goaltenders
These players rank in the top ten in franchise history for wins as of the end of the 2021−22 season. Figures are updated after each completed NHL season. 
  – current Bruins player
Note: GP = Games played; W = Wins; L = Losses; T = Ties; OT = Overtime losses; SO = Shutouts; GAA = Goals against average; * = current Bruins player

NHL awards and trophies

Stanley Cup
 1928–29, 1938–39, 1940–41, 1969–70, 1971–72, 2010–11

Presidents' Trophy
 1989–90, 2013–14, 2019–20

Prince of Wales Trophy
 1927–28, 1928–29, 1929–30, 1930–31, 1932–33, 1934–35, 1937–38, 1938–39, 1939–40, 1940–41, 1970–71, 1971–72, 1973–74, 1987–88, 1989–90, 2010–11, 2012–13, 2018–19

Art Ross Trophy
 Phil Esposito: 1968–69, 1970–71, 1971–72, 1972–73, 1973–74
 Bobby Orr: 1969–70, 1974–75
 Joe Thornton*: 2005–06

(* traded to the San Jose Sharks during the 2005–06 season)

Bill Masterton Memorial Trophy
 Charlie Simmer: 1985–86
 Gord Kluzak: 1989–90
 Cam Neely: 1993–94
 Phil Kessel: 2006–07

Calder Memorial Trophy
 Frank Brimsek: 1938–39 (trophy known as "Calder Trophy")
 Jack Gelineau: 1949–50
 Larry Regan: 1956–57
 Bobby Orr: 1966–67
 Derek Sanderson: 1967–68
 Ray Bourque: 1979–80
 Sergei Samsonov: 1997–98
 Andrew Raycroft: 2003–04

Conn Smythe Trophy
 Bobby Orr: 1969–70, 1971–72
 Tim Thomas: 2010–11

Frank J. Selke Trophy
 Steve Kasper: 1981–82
 Patrice Bergeron: 2011–12, 2013–14, 2014–15, 2016–17, 2021–22

Hart Memorial Trophy
 Eddie Shore: 1932–33, 1934–35, 1935–36, 1937–38
 Bill Cowley: 1940–41, 1942–43
 Milt Schmidt: 1950–51
 Phil Esposito: 1968–69, 1973–74
 Bobby Orr: 1969–70, 1970–71, 1971–72
 Joe Thornton*: 2005–06

(* traded to the San Jose Sharks during the 2005–06 season)

Jack Adams Award
 Don Cherry: 1975–76
 Pat Burns: 1997–98
 Claude Julien: 2008–09
 Bruce Cassidy: 2019–20

James Norris Memorial Trophy
 Bobby Orr: 1967–68, 1968–69, 1969–70, 1970–71, 1971–72, 1972–73, 1973–74, 1974–75
 Ray Bourque: 1986–87, 1987–88, 1989–90, 1990–91, 1993–94
 Zdeno Chara: 2008–09

King Clancy Memorial Trophy
 Ray Bourque: 1991–92
 Dave Poulin: 1992–93
 Patrice Bergeron: 2012–13

Lady Byng Memorial Trophy
 Bobby Bauer: 1939–40, 1940–41, 1946–47
 Don McKenny: 1959–60
 John Bucyk: 1970–71, 1973–74
 Jean Ratelle**: 1975–76
 Rick Middleton: 1981–82

(** traded from the New York Rangers during the 1975–76 season)

Lester B. Pearson Award
 Phil Esposito: 1970–71, 1972–73
 Bobby Orr: 1974–75

Lester Patrick Trophy
 Charles F. Adams: 1966–67
 Walter A. Brown: 1967–68
 Eddie Shore: 1969–70
 Cooney Weiland: 1971–72
 John Bucyk: 1976–77
 Phil Esposito: 1977–78
 Bobby Orr: 1978–79
 Milt Schmidt: 1995–96
 Harry Sinden: 1998–99
 Willie O'Ree: 2002–03
 Ray Bourque: 2002–03
 Cam Neely: 2009–10

Mark Messier Leadership Award
 Zdeno Chara: 2010–11
 Patrice Bergeron: 2020-21

Maurice "Rocket" Richard Trophy
 David Pastrnak: 2019–20

NHL Foundation Player Award
 Patrice Bergeron: 2013–14

NHL Leading Scorer (prior to awarding of Art Ross Trophy)
 Herb Cain: 1943–44
 Bill Cowley: 1940–41
 Milt Schmidt: 1939–40
 Cooney Weiland: 1929–30

Vezina Trophy
 Tiny Thompson: 1929–30, 1932–33, 1935–36, 1937–38
 Frank Brimsek: 1938–39, 1941–42
 Pete Peeters: 1982–83
 Tim Thomas: 2008–09, 2010–11
 Tuukka Rask: 2013–14

William M. Jennings Trophy
 Andy Moog and Rejean Lemelin: 1989–90
 Tim Thomas and Manny Fernandez: 2008–09
 Tuukka Rask and Jaroslav Halak: 2019–20

Team awards
The Bruins have several team awards that are traditionally awarded at the last home game of the regular season.

 Elizabeth C. Dufresne TrophyBest player in home games
 Seventh Player AwardPlayer performing most beyond expectations
 Eddie Shore AwardPlayer with most hustle and determination
 John P. Bucyk AwardCommunity service
 Bruins Radio Network Three-Star AwardsMost three-star selections

Franchise individual records
 Most goals in a season: Phil Esposito, 76 (1970–71)
 Most assists in a season: Bobby Orr, 102 (1970–71)
 Most points in a season: Phil Esposito, 152 (1970–71)
 Most penalty minutes in a season: Jay Miller, 304 (1987–88)
 Lowest goals against average in a season: Frank Brimsek, 1.56, (1938–39)
 Most points per game in a season: Bill Cowley, 1.97 (1943–44)
 Most points in a season, defenseman: Bobby Orr, 139 (1970–71)
 Most points in a season, rookie: Joe Juneau, 102 (1992–93)
 Most wins in a season: Pete Peeters, 40 (1982–83)
 Most shutouts in a season: Hal Winkler, 15 (1927–28)
 Consecutive games streak: John Bucyk, 418 (January 23, 1969 – March 2, 1975)
 Longest point scoring streak: Bronco Horvath, 22 games, (1959–60)
 Highest save percentage in a season: Tim Thomas, .938 (2010–11)
 Longest winning streak by a goaltender, one season: Gilles Gilbert, 17 (1975–76)

Media and broadcasters

 NESN (New England Sports Network)
Jack Edwards: TV play-by-play
Andy Brickley: TV color analyst
Sophia Jurksztowicz: Rinkside reporter
 98.5 The Sports Hub
Judd Sirott: Radio play-by-play
Bob Beers: Radio color analyst

See also
 Boston Bruins Ice Girls
 Bruins–Canadiens rivalry 
 List of Boston Bruins award winners
 List of Boston Bruins records
 Sports in Massachusetts
 Sports in Boston
 Rene Rancourt, former singer of the national anthem for most Bruins home games.
 The Sports Museum (at TD Garden)

Notes

References

Bibliography

Further reading
 
 
 Booth, Clarke. Boston Bruins: Celebrating 75 Years. Tehabi Books.

External links

 
 Boston Bruins Alumni veteran exhibition team

 
National Hockey League teams
1924 establishments in Massachusetts
Atlantic Division (NHL)
Ice hockey clubs established in 1924
Bruins
National Hockey League in New England